Seattle University School of Law,  or Seattle Law School, or SU Law (formerly University of Puget Sound School of Law) is the law school affiliated with Seattle University, the Northwest's largest independent university.

The School is accredited by the American Bar Association and is a member of the Association of American Law Schools.  Alumni of Seattle University School of Law practice in all 50 U.S. states and 18 foreign countries. The law school offers degree programs for Juris Doctor (JD), Master of Laws (LLM) and Master of Studies in Law (MLS).

According to Seattle University School of Law's 2020 ABA-required disclosures, 86% of the class of 2020 obtained bar passage-required or JD-advantage employment nine months after graduation.

History 
The law school was founded as the University of Puget Sound Law School in Tacoma, in 1972. The law school had a favorable admissions policy, and focused on large enrollments, despite the ensuing high attrition (failure) rate. In the mid-1970s, when faced with declining admissions due to demographic changes, the law school responded by increasing enrollment. Despite this, the ABA provided full accreditation to the law school in 1975. In the 1974–75 academic year, the student bar association was established, the first edition of the law review was published, and the first law clinic was started.

In September 1980 the Norton Clapp Law Center was dedicated. This new law center helped to draw a class of 466 students—130 more than anticipated—into the entering class of 1980.

Move to Seattle
Dean Bond resigned to return to teaching in July 1993 and was succeeded by Professor Donald M. Carmichael, a faculty member at the law school since 1978, who had also served as the school's associate dean for academic affairs from 1987 to 1993.

Seattle University purchased the University of Puget Sound Law School in November 1993. The law school officially became part of Seattle University in August 1994.

Kellye Testy was appointed dean on February 15, 2005. During her tenure at the law school she co-founded the Law School's Access to Justice Institute, the Seattle Journal for Social Justice, and the Center on Corporations, Law & Society. In 2009, Testy left Seattle University to be the new dean at the University of Washington School of Law. Mark Niles, Associate Dean for Academic Affairs at the American University Washington College of Law in Washington, D.C., served as dean of the School of Law from 2010 to 2013 before returning to American University.

In 2013, the School of Law welcomed Annette Clark to serve as permanent dean. After completing her MD at the University of Washington in 1985, she earned her J.D. at Seattle University in 1989 and served as a member of the SU Law faculty for many years. Dean Clark was the first alumna of the law school to serve as its dean. Her areas of expertise include civil procedure, medical liability, bioethics, and legal education.

In August 2021, Dean Clark announced her intention to retire. Former Miami Law Dean, Tony Varona was selected to succeed Dean Clark. Prior to serving as Miami Law Dean, Mr. Varona served as Vice Dean, Associate Dean for Faculty and Academic Affairs, and Professor of Law at American University Washington College of Law (AUWCL). Before his 14 years at AUWCL, Dean Varona was an associate professor at Pace University School of Law in New York and adjunct professor at Georgetown University Law Center. He has taught courses in Contracts, Administrative and Public Law, Media Law, Sexuality and Gender Law, Intellectual Property, and Criminal Law.

Location, Institutes, and Centers
Seattle University's  campus is located in the First Hill area of Seattle.

Sullivan Hall

Sullivan Hall, home to the School of Law, is a five-story building housing the law school and law library on the eastern boundary of Seattle University campus. It features a street-front law clinic, media-equipped classrooms, law library, full courtroom, and activity areas.  The court room is used for class, mock trials and actual court proceedings administrated by local judges.

Designed by Olson/Sundberg, the 135,000 square foot building was completed in August 1999 and cost approximately $21 million.

Law Library 
The Seattle University School of Law Library was founded in 1972 .  Located in Sullivan Hall, the library occupies four floors with ample spaces for either individual or group study.  The law library provides information resources and services to support the instructional, research and scholarship endeavors of the Law School.

Access to Justice Institute 
The Access to Justice Institute (ATJI) is home to the law school's pro bono, public interest, and social justice activities. The ATJI is also home to the Incubator Program, which trains and provides resources to lawyers that want to start their own law firms that serve moderate-income clients.

The Adolf A. Berle Jr. Center on Corporations, Law and Society 
The Center promotes and hosts legal research, education, and events on the role of the rule of law to govern and mediate the relationship between governments, corporations, individuals, and society.

Fred T. Korematsu Center for Law and Equality 
The center is the civil rights arm of the law school and it aims to advance justice and equality through research, advocacy, and education. According to their website, the Center seeks to combat discrimination, train the next generation of social justice advocates, and helps underrepresented communities learn to advocate for themselves. The center is named after dissident Fred T. Korematsu, who was incarcerated by the U.S. government during the Japanese internment camps of World War II.

Rankings
Law school rankings of Seattle University School of Law include:
U.S. News & World Report 2023 – #116th overall among law schools in the United States; #7 among legal writing programs; #26 overall among part-time law school programs; #15 among clinical law programs. 
preLaw – "The best schools for doing good" (Fall 2018) – A+ among law schools for public interest law.
The National Jurist – A for "business, corporate, and banking."

Juris Doctor program

Admissions
Admission to the law school is competitive with an acceptance rate of 59%. In admission decisions, the law school places equal emphasis on three factors: (1) LSAT performance; (2) the undergraduate academic record; and (3) personal achievements.  Admission is made to either the full-time day or part-time evening program.  The mean LSAT score for admitted students is 154, and the median undergraduate GPA is 3.24.

Students admitted to the full-time program can choose to begin classes in June to reduce their first semester course-load in August.  All part-time students begin in June.

2018 matriculating students were 63% women, 4% veterans, 32% students of color, 19% identify as LGBTQ, and average age of 27.

Focus areas
Seattle University School of Law offers "pathways" as one way for students to decide which courses to take, though choosing a pathway is not required. These pathways demonstrate sequences within and connections across the curriculum.  Current pathways include:
Business law
Constitutional law
Commercial law
Criminal law
Environmental law, natural resource, and land use
Family law 
Health law
Law and social inequality
Intellectual property, innovation and technology
Litigation
Labor and employment law
Real estate law
Taxation law

Employment
According to the school's official 2017 ABA-required disclosures, 76.5% of the class of 2017 obtained bar passage-required employment nine months after graduation. Seattle University School of Law's Law School Transparency under-employment score is 22.8%, indicating the percentage of the class of 2017 unemployed, pursuing an additional degree, or working in a non-professional, short-term, or part-time job nine months after graduation.

Costs and financial aid
The total cost of attendance (indicating the cost of full-time tuition, fees, and living expenses) at Seattle University School of Law for the academic year is $70,564.

The Law School Transparency estimated debt-financed cost of attendance for three years is $235,798.

Publications
Seattle University Law Review (flagship journal)
Seattle Journal for Social Justice
Seattle Journal of Technology, Environmental, and Innovation Law
The American Indian Law Journal

Notable alumni
Greg Anton, musician, recording artist, writer, and practicing attorney
Ralph Beistline, Chief Judge, United States District Court for the District of Alaska.
Anne Bremner, trial attorney and legal commentator
 Desley Brooks, former member of the Oakland City Council, former Vice Mayor of Oakland, California, and lawyer
Annette Clark, Dean of Seattle University School of Law
Frank E. Cuthbertson, first African-American judge on the Pierce County Superior Court
Janet K.G. Dickson, law professor and legal writing expert
 Joe Fain, member of the Washington State Senate and lawyer
Tom Galligan, former college president and Dean of the Paul M. Hebert Law Center
 Lorena González, politician, President of Seattle City Council
 Kristin Hannah, novelist, writer of The Nightingale (2015)
John J. Burns, Attorney General of Alaska
 Nick Harper, member of the Washington State Senate and lawyer
Steve Haugaard, politician, Speaker of the South Dakota House of Representatives
 Laurie Jinkins, politician, Speaker of the Washington House of Representatives.
 Charles W. Johnson, Associate Chief Judge, Washington Supreme Court
 Debora Juarez, member of the Seattle City Council and lawyer
 Anne Kirkpatrick, first female police chief of Oakland
Richard Labunski, American columnist and journalism professor
Lee Lambert, Chancellor of Pima Community College
Paula Lustbader, law professor, renowned legal educator in professional civility
 Rajeev Majumdar, lawyer and President of the Washington State Bar Association
William Marler, food-borne illness attorney
Steve McAlpine, lawyer and 5th Lieutenant Governor of Alaska
Mark D. McLaughlin, business executive and CEO of cybersecurity firm Palo Alto Networks, Inc.
Ron Meyers, trial attorney and former Speaker Pro Tempore of the Washington House of Representatives
Brian T. Moran, United States Attorney for the Western District of Washington
Laurel Currie Oates, author, law professor, co-founder of the Legal Writing Institute, and pioneer in the academic field of legal writing 
 Steve O'Ban, member of the Washington State Senate and lawyer
 Patrick Oishi, prosecutor and current judge of the King County Superior Court
 Sean Parnell, former Governor of Alaska and lawyer
Joe Paskvan, former member of the Alaskan House of Representatives
Linda Lau, former Judge, Washington Court of Appeals
Benson Porter, banker, current president and CEO of BECU
 Michele Radosevich, Wisconsin State Senator and lawyer
Mary Robnett, first woman Pierce County Prosecuting Attorney.
Cheryl Pflug, member of the Washington State Senate.
Greg Gilday, member of the Washington State House of Representatives
 Angela Rye, former general counsel for the Congressional Black Caucus, political commentator, activist, and entrepreneur
Charles Swift, national security law and civil rights expert, defense counsel in Hamdan v. Rumsfeld
Linda Trujillo, politician, member of the New Mexico House of Representatives
Christine Quinn-Brintnall, former Judge, Washington Court of Appeals
Bill Walker, former Governor of Alaska and former mayor of Valdez, Alaska
Tracy Staab, Judge, Washington Court of Appeals
Richard N.W. Wohns, renowned neurosurgeon and professor
Homer Bone, former Circuit Judge, United States Court of Appeals for the Ninth Circuit and United States Senator
Rufus Yerxa, former Deputy Director-General of the World Trade Organization and former Deputy U.S. Trade Representative
Eric Gibbs, consumer protection law expert and attorney
Lisa L. Sutton, Judge, Washington Court of Appeals 
G. Helen Whitener, Associate Justice, Washington Supreme Court 
Tarra Simmons, lawyer, politician, member of the Washington State House of Representatives 
Katrina Foley, Member, Orange County Board of Supervisors, former Mayor of Costa Mesa, and attorney
Jamal Whitehead, 2022 nominee for judge of the United States District Court for the Western District of Washington

Notable faculty 
Cyrus Vance Jr., Manhattan District Attorney
Dean Spade, founder of the Sylvia Rivera Law Project 
David Skover, constitutional law scholar
Eduardo Peñalver, former Dean of Cornell Law School and property law scholar
Jill Otake, Judge, United States District Court for the District of Hawaii
Nikkita Oliver, political activist 
Courtney Milan, legal scholar and pioneer of the #MeToo movement in the federal judiciary
Wallace Loh, former Seattle University Law School dean, legal scholar, and renowned academic administrator
Lauren King, Judge of the United States District Court for the Western District of Washington
Mary Yu, Associate Justice, Supreme Court of Washington
Laurel Currie Oates, pioneer of the legal writing academic field 
Randy Gordon, attorney and former member of the Washington State Senate
Richard Delgado, legal scholar and pioneer of critical race theory in the law
Annette Clark, legal scholar, bioethicist, and Dean of Seattle University Law School
Joaquin Avila, renowned civil rights attorney, drafter of the California Voting Rights Act, and MacArthur Genius Fellow 
John McKay, former United States Attorney for the Western District of Washington 
Charles W. Johnson, Associate Chief Justice, Supreme Court of Washington 
Cyrus Habib, former Lieutenant Governor of Washington

References

External links

Seattle University colleges and schools
Catholic law schools in the United States
Educational institutions established in 1972
Law schools in Washington (state)
Universities and colleges in Seattle
1972 establishments in Washington (state)